Grisollea thomassetii is a species of plant in the Stemonuraceae family. It is endemic to Seychelles.

References

Trees of Seychelles
thomassetii
Vulnerable plants
Endemic flora of Seychelles
Taxonomy articles created by Polbot